Ikarus, the Flying Man (German: Ikarus, der fliegende Mensch) is a 1918 German silent war film directed by Carl Froelich and starring Ernst Hofmann, Esther Carena and Gustav Botz. While a press screening was held in October 1918, during the final weeks of the First World War, it did not go on general release until the following July when it premiered at the Marmorhaus in Berlin.

The film's sets were designed by the art director Artur Günther. It was shot at the Tempelhof Studios in Berlin.

Cast
 Gustav Botz as Günthers Father 
 Esther Carena as Clemense de 
 Olga Engl as Günthers Mother 
 Ernst Hofmann as Günther Ellinghaus 
 Heinz Sarnow
 Edith Sorel as Eriks

References

Bibliography
 Bock, Hans-Michael & Bergfelder, Tim. The Concise CineGraph. Encyclopedia of German Cinema. Berghahn Books, 2009.

External links

1918 films
German silent feature films
Films directed by Carl Froelich
German black-and-white films
Films based on German novels
1918 war films
German war films
Films of the German Empire
Films shot at Tempelhof Studios
World War I aviation films
Silent war films
1910s German films